Dinesh Kumar (mononymously known as Dinesh) is an Indian choreographer working with South Indian films, including Tamil films. He won the 2011 National Film Award for Best Choreography for his work in Aadukalam (Tamil)

Dinesh Kumar is born in madras and currently resides in Chennai. He won the 58th National Film Award for Best Choreographer for the Film "Aadukalam". He won rich praises from the Jury with the comments 'This National Award for Best Choreography is awarded to Dinesh Kumar For the Native Charm and Innovative Design in the art of Choreography that creates an Effervescent Energy in the Spectator".

He also won the Filmfare Award for Best Dance Choreographer – South for Ayan (2009).

He has also won Vijay Award for Best Choreographer twice, Pokkiri  (2007) and  Easan  (2010).

He occasionally makes appearances in the song which he had choreographed. He made his acting debut as lead actor with Oru Kuppa Kathai (2018).

Filmography
Choreographer

 Manadhai Thirudivittai (2001)
 Shahjahan (2001)
 Thamizhan (2002)
 April Maadhathil (2002)
 Youth (2002)
 Bagavathi (2002)
 Ramanaa (2002)
 Dum (2003)
 Anbe Sivam (2003)
 Vaseegara (2003)
 Parthiban Kanavu (2003)
 Jay Jay (2003)
 Saamy (2003)
 Machi (2004)
 Giri (2004)
 Attahasam (2004)
 Vasool Raja MBBS (2004)
 M. Kumaran S/O Mahalakshmi (2004)
 Chellamae (2004)
 Pudhukottaiyilirundhu Saravanan (2004)
 Arul (2004)
 Rajamanikyam (2005) (Malayalam)
 February 14 (2005)
 Thotti Jaya (2005)
 Majaa (2005)
 Sandakozhi (2005)
 Sivakasi (2005)
 Ghajini (2005)
 Daas (2005)
 Maayavi  (2005)
 Devathayai Kanden (2005)
 Ji (2005)
 Raam (2005)
 Jithan  (2005)
 Rendu (2006)
 Something Something... Unakkum Enakkum (2006)
 Vathiyar (2006)
 Thimiru (2006)
 Vikramarkudu  (2006) (Telugu)
 Pudhupettai  (2006)
 Pokkiri  (2007)
 Chotta Mumbai  (2007) (Malayalam)
 Dubai Seenu  (2007) (Telugu)
 Yamadonga  (2007) (Telugu)
 Desamuduru  (2007) (Telugu)
 Thaamirabharani  (2007)
 Azhagiya Tamil Magan  (2007)
 Aalwar  (2007)
 Kireedam  (2007)
 Paruthiveeran  (2007)
 Vel  (2007)
 Annan Thambi  (2008) (Malayalam)
 Souryam  (2008) (Telugu)
 Thiruvannamalai  (2008)
 Satyam  (2008)
 Aegan  (2008)
 Yaaradi Nee Mohini  (2008)
 Kick  (2009) (Telugu)
 Bumper Offer  (2009) (Telugu)
 Malai Malai  (2009)
 Villu  (2009)
 Laadam  (2009)
 Ayan (2009)
 Thoranai  (2009)
 Pasanga  (2009)
 Naadodigal  (2009)
 Subramaniapuram  (2009)
 Padikkadavan  (2009)
 Aadhavan  (2009)
 Vettaikaaran  (2009)
 Yogi  (2009)
 Sarvam (2009)
 Anwar  (2010) (Malayalam)
 Varudu  (2010) (Telugu)
 Ragada  (2010) (Telugu)
 Maanja Velu  (2010)
 Bale Pandiya  (2010)
 Inidhu Inidhu  (2010)
 Easan  (2010)
 Vamsam  (2010)
 Madrasapattinam  (2010)
 Chikku Bukku  (2010)
 Sura  (2010)
 Enthiran  (2010)
 Mandhira Punnagai  (2010)
 Boss Engira Bhaskaran  (2010)
 Kaavalan  (2011)
 Poraali  (2011)
 Aadukalam (2011)
 Panjaa  (2011) (Telugu)
 Dookudu  (2011) (Telugu)
 Thambi Vettothi Sundaram  (2011)
 Mouna Guru  (2011)
 Vandhaan Vendraan  (2011)
 Ko  (2011)
 Velayudham  (2011)
 Sadhurangam  (2011)
 Oru Kal Oru Kannadi  (2011)
 Kazhugu  (2012)
 Businessman (2012)
 Devudu Chesina Manushulu  (2012) (Telugu)
 Thuppakki (2012)
 Cameraman Gangatho Rambabu  (2012) (Telugu)
 Gabbar Singh  (2012) (Telugu)
 Genius  (2012) (Telugu)
 Dhoni  (2012)
 Sundarapandian  (2012)
 Maattrraan  (2012)
 Naan Rajavaga Pogiren (2013)
 Naayak  (2013) (Telugu)
 Seethamma Vakitlo Sirimalle Chettu  (2013) (Telugu)
 Matru Ki Bijlee Ka Mandola (2013) (Hindi)
 Thalaivaa (2013)
 Arrambam (2013)
 Ameerin Aadhi Baghavan (2013)
 Attarintiki Daredi (2013)
 Ethir Neechal (2013)
 All in All Azhagu Raja (2013)
 Varuthapadatha Valibar Sangam (2013)
 Kedi Billa Killadi Ranga (2013)
 Ya Ya (2013)
 Kutti Puli (2013)
 Desingu Raja (2013)
 Veeram (2014)
 Idhu Kathirvelan Kadhal (2014)
 Maan Karate (2014)
 Vallinam (2014)
 Oru Kanniyum Moonu Kalavaanikalum (2014)
 Ninaithathu Yaaro (2014)
 Sathuranga Vettai (2014)
 Manjapai (2014)
 Vanavarayan Vallavarayan (2014)
 Komban (2015)
 Nannbenda (2015)
 Vasuvum Saravananum Onna Padichavanga (2015)
 Rajini Murugan (2016)
 Gethu (2016)
 24 (2016)
 Brahmotsavam (2016)
 Kadavul Irukaan Kumaru (2016)
 Bairavaa (2017)
 Thupparivaalan (2017)
 Thaana Serndha Kootam (2018)
 Kalakalappu 2 (2018)
 Seema Raja (2018)
 Krishnarjuna Yudham (2018) (Telugu)
 Sui Dhaaga (2018) (Hindi)
 Vada Chennai (2018)
 Mayanadhi (2019)
 Mr. Local (2019)
 Bigil (2019)
 Valimai (2020)
 Master (2021)
 Acharya (2022) (Telugu)
 Gold (2022) (Malayalam)
 Leo (2023) 
As Actor
 Oru Kuppai Kathai (2018)
Nayae Peyae (2021)
Sambhavam (2021)
Dancer
Coolie (1995) – Dancer in song "Rum Rum"
12B (2001) – Dancer in song "Sariya Thavara"
Thalaivaa (2013) – Dancer in song "Vaanganna"
Appathava Aattaya Pottutanga - Dancer in song "Enna Elavu Kathal"

Personal life
Dinesh Kumar is married to Revathy, his friend. They both were residing in Lein Street in Uthandi, Chennai. Dinesh had admitted to his interview with Kumudham magazine that it was his wife who supported him on difficult time when he was aspiring to get into the Film Industry.

Dinesh studied in Rama Krishna Mission higher Secondary School(Main) in T.Nagar and later in Nandanam Arts College. He was introduced to Sundaram Master ( Mugur Sundar) by Nagendra Prasad (Youngest brother of Prabhu Deva  and Raju Sundaram) and was inducted to the team of Prabhu Deva and Raju Sundaram.
He is born with four brother's Ravi, Sathish, Kavin and Sajimal.

References

.^ www.keral.com/picturehighlight.aspx?std=705 – Australia

External links
 
  Dinesh  Kumar, filmography
 A chat with choreographer Dinesh  Kumar, Interview

Indian film choreographers
Living people
Tamil cinema
Artists from Chennai
Filmfare Awards winners
Dancers from Tamil Nadu
21st-century Indian dancers
Best Choreography National Film Award winners
Male actors in Tamil cinema
1967 births